NanoLinux
is an open source, free and very lightweight Linux distribution that requires only 14 MB of disk space including tiny versions of the most common desktop applications and several games. It is based on the Core version of the Tiny Core Linux
distribution and uses Busybox, Nano-X instead of X.Org, FLTK 1.3.x as the default GUI toolkit, and SLWM (super-lightweight window manager). The included applications are mainly based on FLTK.

Applications included in the distribution 

Nanolinux includes several lightweight applications, including:
 Dillo graphical web browser
 FlWriter word processor
 Sprsht spreadsheet application
 FLTDJ personal information manager
 AntiPaint painting application
 Fluff file manager
 NXterm terminal emulator
 Flcalc calculator
 FlView image viewer
 Fleditor text editor
 FlChat IRC client
 FlMusic CD player
 FlRadio internet radio
 Webserver, mount tool, system statistics, package install utility.

The distribution also includes several games, such as Tuxchess, Checkers, NXeyes, Mastermind, Sudoku and Blocks.
Support for TrueType fonts and UTF-8 is also provided. Nanolinux is distributed as Live CD ISO images, installation on flash disk
and hard disk
is documented on its Wiki pages.

System requirements 

Minimal configuration:
The Live CD version without swapfile requires 64 MB of RAM and 14 MB of disk space.

See also 

 Comparison of Linux live distributions
 Lightweight Linux distribution
 List of Linux distributions that run from RAM

References 

 Nanolinux on Softpedia
 RedesZone
 wordpress.com

External links 

Light-weight Linux distributions
Operating system distributions bootable from read-only media
Linux distributions without systemd
Linux distributions